Empire Heath was a  cargo ship which was built in 1941 by Bartram & Sons Ltd for the Ministry of War Transport. During the Second World War, she served as a CAM ship, armed with a Hawker Hurricane aircraft.

History
Empire Heath was north west of the small volcanic island of Trinidade whilst sailing from Victoria, Brazil to Loch Ewe for orders, via Freetown, with a cargo of iron ore. Initially, U-129 fired three torpedoes at her but all missed. Subsequently, at 23.00 hours, U-129 fired a FAT torpedo which hit and Empire Heath sank rapidly. The U-boat crew rescued Chief Steward Frederick Wakeham, one of the survivors and captured him for questioning. He was landed in Lorient on 19 July and taken to the POW camp Marlag und Milag Nord. Overall, the master, 46 crew members, one passenger and nine gunners were lost. The wreck is located at 21.31S 29.50W.

References

1941 ships
Empire ships